Babu Paul (born 7 July 1955) is an Indian politician from the Communist Party of India. He represented Muvattupuzha constituency in 12th Kerala Legislative Assembly.

References

Communist Party of India politicians from Kerala
1955 births
Living people